Nisson Alpert (1927–May 25, 1986) was one of the most outstanding and prominent students of Rabbi Moshe Feinstein.

Biography
Rabbi Nisson Lipa Alpert was born in 1927 in Polanka, a small shtetl in Poland.  He was named after his maternal grandfather, Rabbi Nisson Lipa Joselowitz, rosh yeshiva in Lazday, Poland, and later the rabbi of Polanka.  His father Rabbi Shabsai Alpert was a student of the Mir Yeshiva and cousin of the Rabbi Yisrael Meir Kagan, the Chofetz Chaim.  His mother was Guta Yachne Joselowitz.  Nisson had three sisters:  Rita, Sarah, and Freida.

Rabbi Alpert's father decided to move his family to the United States, and traveled there ahead of his family.  However, World War II broke out before everyone could come.  In December 1939, his mother and family crossed the border to Lithuania.  Rebbetzin Alpert obtained one of the first transit visas from Chiune Sugihara, and crossed Russia with the family to Japan.  From there they traveled to San Francisco, and finally to the Lower East Side of New York City.

Although Nisson arrived in America at the age of 12 with no knowledge of English, he graduated Washington Irving High School as valedictorian of his class.  He learned at Mesivtha Tifereth Jerusalem, where he became a very close disciple of Rabbi Moshe Feinstein.  Rebbetzin Shima Feinstein arranged the match between Rav Nisson and Zeldi Scheinberg, the daughter of Rabbi Chaim Pinchas Scheinberg.

Rabbi Alpert was one of the founders of Peylim.

He first was rabbi of the East Third Street Shul in the Lower East Side, and later became the rav of Agudath Israel of Long Island. In 1967, he was appointed as a Rosh Yeshiva at the Rabbi Isaac Elchanan Theological Seminary, before becoming the first Rosh Kollel of its Kollel L’Horaah— Yadin-Yadin. He was a great Torah scholar.

In 1983, Rabbi and Rebbetzin Alpert suffered the sudden tragic loss of their 19-year-old son Yishaya Mendel.

Rabbi Alpert died at the age of 58 on Sunday evening, 17 Iyar, 5746 (May 25, 1986), about two months after the passing of his mentor, Rabbi Moshe Feinstein. He is buried on Har Hazeisim in Jerusalem.

Writings
 Beit Habechirah of the Meiri on Bava Metzia.
 Commentary of the Raavad on Bava Metzia.
 Limmudei Nissan on the Torah and on Tractate Beitzah.

Notes

References
 

1920s births
1986 deaths
Yeshiva University rosh yeshivas
20th-century American rabbis
Jews who emigrated to escape Nazism
Burials at the Jewish cemetery on the Mount of Olives
People from the Lower East Side
Sugihara's Jews